Health Alliance International (HAI) in a non-profit organization based in Seattle, Washington, USA. HAI is an international public health organization, and a center of the University of Washington Department of Global Health, currently working in Mozambique, East Timor, and Côte d'Ivoire. HAI focuses on supporting government Ministries of Health to expand services at a national level in order to boost the overall health infrastructure of a country, and to strengthen its ability to provide sustainable sector-wide services. HAI is notable for its focus on a sector-wide approach to supporting health systems, rather than working "vertically" and independently of the local government.

History 
HAI was founded in 1987 by Steve Gloyd. In Mozambique, HAI supports the Ministry of Health in building the country's HIV/AIDS treatment services. In East Timor, HAI supports the Ministry of Health to strengthen the country's maternal and newborn care services. HAI also has a history of advocacy for the right to health for the poor.

References

External links
 Health Alliance International website
 Slate Article on AIDS, Mozambique, and HAI

Public health organizations
Organizations based in Seattle